Foot orienteering (usually referred to as simply Orienteering or FootO for short) is the oldest formal orienteering sport, and the one with the most "starts" per year.  Usually, a FootO is a timed race in which participants start at staggered intervals, are individually timed, and are expected to perform all navigation on their own.  The control points are shown on the orienteering map and must be visited in the specified order.  Standings are determined first by successful completion of the course, then by shortest time on course.

FootO is one of four orienteering disciplines governed by the International Orienteering Federation.

History
The history of orienteering began in the late 19th century in Sweden. The actual term "orienteering" was first used in 1886 and meant the crossing of unknown land with the aid of a map and a compass. The first orienteering competition open to the public was held in Norway in 1897. Notable dates for member nations of the IOF are shown below.

Formats
The official formats in the World Orienteering Championships, which is followed by most regional and national championships, include the following:

Long distance
The long distance competition, previously called the classic distance competition, is the longest and toughest individual competition. Long competitions are held in forest, with expected winning time of 90 – 100 minutes for men and 70 to 80 minutes for women, in physically demanding terrain with large-scale route choices and varying scale of technical difficulties.

Middle distance
The middle distance competition, previously called the short distance competition, is a relatively shorter race held in forest, with expected winning time of 30–35 minutes in technically complex terrain.

Sprint
Sprint competitions are high-speed competitions held in urban areas, which is technically easy but with difficult route choices. The expected winning time is 12–15 minutes.

Relay
The relay, composed of teams of 3, is a mass start event where different runners are separated by means of forking. The finish order is directly determined at the finish line.

Sprint relay
The sprint relay is run by teams of 4, where the first and the last must be women, in urban areas with mass start and forking. It is an exciting and television-friendly event where the runners compete head-to-head at a high-speed.

IOF events

World championships

The World Orienteering Championships are held annually. , Europe has been dominant.

International championships
 World Orienteering Championships
 Junior World Orienteering Championships
 World Masters Orienteering Championships
 European Orienteering Championships

References

Orienteering
Orienteering